Siphonidiidae is a family of sponges belonging to the order Tetractinellida.

Genera:
 Gastrophanella Schmidt, 1879
 Lithobactrum Kirkpatrick, 1903
 Siphonidium Schmidt, 1879

References

Sponge families